Calliostoma ocellatum is a species of sea snail, a marine gastropod mollusk in the family Calliostomatidae.

Description
The shell has a rather broadly conical shape. It is reddish fulvous, ocellated with brown-shaded white spots. The whorls are concavely impressed round the upper parts, then rounded, and spirally grain-ridged throughout. The shell is rather constricted below the sutures, then rounded and ocellated with shaded opaque-white spots.

Distribution
This species occurs in the Indian Ocean off Mauritius.

References

Trew, A., 1984. The Melvill-Tomlin Collection. Part 30. Trochacea. Handlists of the Molluscan Collections in the Department of Zoology, National Museum of Wales

External links
To Biodiversity Heritage Library (2 publications)
To World Register of Marine Species

ocellatum
Gastropods described in 1863